Leath is a surname. Notable people with the surname include:

 Marvin Leath (1931–2000), American politician from Texas
 Raynella Leath (born 1948), former life prisoner in America
 Steven Leath (born 1957), American academic administrator
 Vaughn De Leath (1894–1943), American singer with stage name adapted from her surname Vonderlieth

Other uses of the name
 Leath Correctional Institution, South Carolina
 Porter-Leath, non-profit organisation in Memphis, Tennessee
 Porter-Leath House, historic house in Memphis

See also
 Leath Cuinn and Leath Moga, legendary divisions of Ireland